4 (four) is a number, numeral and digit. It is the natural number following 3 and preceding 5. It is a square number, the smallest semiprime and composite number, and is considered unlucky in many East Asian cultures.

In mathematics 
Four is the sum and product of two with itself: , the only number  such that , which also makes four the smallest squared prime number . In Knuth's up-arrow notation, and so forth, for any number of up arrows. By consequence, four is the only square one more than a prime number, specifically three. The sum of the first four prime numbers two + three + five + seven is the only sum of four consecutive prime numbers that yields an odd prime number, seventeen, which is the fourth super-prime. Four lies between the first proper pair of twin primes, three and five, which are the first two Fermat primes, like seventeen, which is the third. On the other hand, the square of four, equivalently the fourth power of two, is sixteen; the only number that has  as a form of factorization. Holistically, there are four elementary arithmetic operations in mathematics: addition (+), subtraction (−), multiplication (×), and division (÷); and four basic number systems, the real numbers , rational numbers , integers , and natural numbers .

Four is a solution to the expression , where .

Each natural number divisible by 4 is a difference of squares of two natural numbers, i.e. . A number is a multiple of 4 if its last two digits are a multiple of 4. For example, 1092 is a multiple of 4 because .

Lagrange's four-square theorem states that every positive integer can be written as the sum of at most four square numbers. Three are not always sufficient;  for instance cannot be written as the sum of three squares.

There are four all-Harshad numbers: 1, 2, 4, and 6. 12, which is divisible by four thrice over, is a Harshad number in all bases except octal.

A four-sided plane figure is a quadrilateral or quadrangle, sometimes also called a tetragon. It can be further classified as a rectangle or oblong, kite, rhombus, and square.

Four is the highest degree general polynomial equation for which there is a solution in radicals.

The four-color theorem states that a planar graph (or, equivalently, a flat map of two-dimensional regions such as countries) can be colored using four colors, so that adjacent vertices (or regions) are always different colors. Three colors are not, in general, sufficient to guarantee this. The largest planar complete graph has four vertices.

A solid figure with four faces as well as four vertices is a tetrahedron, which is the smallest possible number of faces and vertices a polyhedron can have. The regular tetrahedron, also called a 3-simplex, is the simplest Platonic solid. It has four regular triangles as faces that are themselves at dual positions with the vertices of another tetrahedron. Tetrahedra can be inscribed inside all other four Platonic solids, and tessellate space alongside the regular octahedron in the alternated cubic honeycomb.

Four-dimensional space is the highest-dimensional space featuring more than three regular convex figures: 
Two-dimensional: infinitely many regular polygons.
Three-dimensional: five regular polyhedra; the five Platonic solids which are the tetrahedron, cube, octahedron, dodecahedron, and icosahedron. 
Four-dimensional: six regular polychora; the 5-cell, 8-cell or tesseract, 16-cell, 24-cell, 120-cell, and 600-cell. The 24-cell, made of regular octahedra, has no analogue in any other dimension; it is self-dual, with its 24-cell honeycomb dual to the 16-cell honeycomb. 
Five-dimensional and every higher dimension: three regular convex -polytopes, all within the infinite family of regular -simplexes, -hypercubes, and -orthoplexes.

The fourth dimension is also the highest dimension where regular self-intersecting figures exist:
Two-dimensional: infinitely many regular star polygons.
Three-dimensional: four regular star polyhedra, the regular Kepler-Poinsot star polyhedra. 
Four-dimensional: ten regular star polychora, the Schläfli–Hess star polychora. They contain cells of Kepler-Poinsot polyhedra alongside regular tetrahedra, icosahedra and dodecahedra.
Five-dimensional and every higher dimension: zero regular star-polytopes; uniform star polytopes in dimensions  >  are the most symmetric, which mainly originate from stellations of regular -polytopes.

Altogether, sixteen (or 16 = 42) regular convex and star polychora are generated from symmetries of four (4) Coxeter Weyl groups and point groups in the fourth dimension: the  simplex,  hypercube,  icositetrachoric, and  hexacosichoric groups; with the  demihypercube group generating two alternative constructions.   

There are also two infinite families of duoprisms and antiprismatic prisms in the fourth dimension.

Four-dimensional differential manifolds have some unique properties. There is only one differential structure on  except when  = , in which case there are uncountably many.

The smallest non-cyclic group has four elements; it is the Klein four-group. A alternating groups are not simple for values  ≤ .

Further extensions of the real numbers under Hurwitz's theorem states that there are four normed division algebras: the real numbers , the complex numbers , the quaternions , and the octonions . The real numbers are ordered, commutative and associative algebras, as well as alternative algebras with power-associativity. The complex numbers  share all four multiplicative algebraic properties of the reals , without being ordered. The quaternions loose a further commutative algebraic property, while holding associative, alternative, and power-associative properties. The octonions are alternative and power-associative, while the sedenions are only power-associative.

List of basic calculations

Evolution of the Hindu-Arabic digit

Brahmic numerals represented 1, 2, and 3 with as many lines. 4 was simplified by joining its four lines into a cross that looks like the modern plus sign. The Shunga would add a horizontal line on top of the digit, and the Kshatrapa and Pallava evolved the digit to a point where the speed of writing was a secondary concern. The Arabs' 4 still had the early concept of the cross, but for the sake of efficiency, was made in one stroke by connecting the "western" end to the "northern" end; the "eastern" end was finished off with a curve. The Europeans dropped the finishing curve and gradually made the digit less cursive, ending up with a digit very close to the original Brahmin cross.

On the seven-segment displays of pocket calculators and digital watches, as well as certain optical character recognition fonts, 4 is seen with an open top.

Television stations that operate on channel 4 have occasionally made use of another variation of the "open 4", with the open portion being on the side, rather than the top. This version resembles the Canadian Aboriginal syllabics letter ᔦ. The magnetic ink character recognition "CMC-7" font also uses this variety of "4".

In religion

Buddhism
Four Noble Truths – Dukkha, Samudaya, Nirodha, Magga
Four sights – observations which affected Prince Siddhartha deeply and made him realize the sufferings of all beings, and compelled him to begin his spiritual journey—an old man, a sick man, a dead man, and an ascetic
Four Great Elements – earth, water, fire, and wind
Four Heavenly Kings
Four Foundations of Mindfulness – contemplation of the body, contemplation of feelings, contemplation of mind, contemplation of mental objects
Four Right Exertions
Four Bases of Power
Four jhānas
Four arūpajhānas
Four Divine Abidings – loving-kindness, compassion, sympathetic joy, and equanimity
Four stages of enlightenment – stream-enterer, once-returner, non-returner, and arahant
Four main pilgrimage sites – Lumbini, Bodh Gaya, Sarnath, and Kusinara

Judeo-Christian symbolism
The Tetragrammaton is the four-letter name of God.
Ezekiel has a vision of four living creatures: a man, a lion, an ox, and an eagle.
The four Matriarchs (foremothers) of Judaism are Sarah, Rebekah, Leah, and Rachel.
The Four Species (lulav, hadass, aravah and etrog) are taken as one of the mitzvot on the Jewish holiday of Sukkot. (Judaism)
The Four Cups of Wine to drink on the Jewish holiday of Passover. (Judaism)
The Four Questions to be asked on the Jewish holiday of Passover. (Judaism)
The Four Sons to be dealt with on the Jewish holiday of Passover. (Judaism)
The Four Expressions of Redemption to be said on the Jewish holiday of Passover. (Judaism)
The four Gospels: Matthew, Mark, Luke, and John. (Christianity)
The Four Horsemen of the Apocalypse ride in the Book of Revelation. (Christianity)
The four holy cities of Judaism: Jerusalem, Hebron, Safed, and Tiberius

Hinduism
There are four Vedas: Rigveda, Samaveda, Yajurveda and Atharvaveda.
In Puruṣārtha, there are four aims of human life: Dharma, Artha, Kāma, Moksha.
The four stages of life Brahmacharya (student life), Grihastha (household life), Vanaprastha (retired life) and Sannyasa (renunciation).
The four primary castes or strata of society: Brahmana (priest/teacher), Kshatriya (warrior/politician), Vaishya (landowner/entrepreneur) and Shudra (servant/manual laborer).
The swastika symbol is traditionally used in Hindu religions as a sign of good luck and signifies good from all four directions.
The god Brahma has four faces.
There are four yugas: Satya, Dvapara, Treta and Kali

Islam
Eid al-Adha lasts for four days, from the 10th to the 14th of Dhul Hijja.
The four holy cities of Islam: Mecca, Medina, Jerusalem and Damascus.
The four tombs in the Green Dome: Muhammad, Abu Bakr, Umar ibn Khattab and Isa ibn Maryam (Jesus).
There are four Rashidun or Rightly Guided Caliphs: Abu Bakr, Umar ibn al-Khattab, Uthman ibn Affan and Ali ibn Abi Talib.
The Four Arch Angels in Islam are: Jibraeel (Gabriel), Mikaeel (Michael), Izraeel (Azrael), and Israfil (Raphael)
There are four months in which war is not permitted: Muharram, Rajab, Dhu al-Qi'dah and Dhu al-Hijjah.
There are four Sunni schools of fiqh: Hanafi, Shafi`i, Maliki and Hanbali.
There are four major Sunni Imams: Abū Ḥanīfa, Muhammad ibn Idris ash-Shafi`i, Malik ibn Anas and Ahmad ibn Hanbal.
There are four books in Islam: Taurait, Zaboor, Injeel, Quran.
Waiting for four months is ordained for those who take an oath for abstention from their wives.
The waiting period of the woman whose husband dies is four months and ten days.
When Abraham said: "My Lord, show me how You give life to the dead," Allah said: "Why! Do you have no faith?" Abraham replied: "Yes, but in order that my heart be at rest." He said: "Then take four birds, and tame them to yourself, then put a part of them on every hill, and summon them; they will come to you flying. [Al-Baqara 2:260]
The respite of four months was granted to give time to the mushriks in Surah At-Tawba so that they should consider their position carefully and decide whether to make preparation for war or to emigrate from the country or to accept Islam.
Those who accuse honorable women (of unchastity) but do not produce four witnesses, flog them with eighty lashes, and do not admit their testimony ever after. They are indeed transgressors. [An-Noor 24:4]

Taoism
Four Symbols of I Ching

Other
In a more general sense, numerous mythological and cosmogonical systems consider Four corners of the world as essentially corresponding to the four points of the compass.
Four is the sacred number of the Zia, an indigenous tribe located in the U.S. state of New Mexico.
The Chinese, the Koreans, and the Japanese are superstitious about the number four because it is a homonym for "death" in their languages.
In Slavic mythology, the god Svetovid has four heads.

In politics
Four Freedoms: four fundamental freedoms that Franklin D. Roosevelt declared ought to be enjoyed by everyone in the world: Freedom of Speech, Freedom of Religion, Freedom from Want, Freedom from Fear.
Gang of Four: Popular name for four Chinese Communist Party leaders who rose to prominence during China's Cultural Revolution, but were ousted in 1976 following the death of Chairman Mao Zedong. Among the four was Mao's widow, Jiang Qing. Since then, many other political factions headed by four people have been called "Gangs of Four".

In computing
Four bits (half a byte) are sometimes called a nibble.

In science
A tetramer is an oligomer formed out of four sub-units.

In astronomy
Four terrestrial (or rocky) planets in the Solar System: Mercury, Venus, Earth, and Mars.
Four giant gas/ice planets in the Solar System: Jupiter, Saturn, Uranus, and Neptune.
Four of Jupiter's moons (the Galilean moons) are readily visible from Earth with a hobby telescope.
Messier object M4, a magnitude 7.5 globular cluster in the constellation Scorpius.
The Roman numeral IV stands for subgiant in the Yerkes spectral classification scheme.

In biology
Four is the number of nucleobase types in DNA and RNA – adenine, guanine, cytosine, thymine (uracil in RNA).
Many chordates have four feet, legs or leglike appendages (tetrapods).
The mammalian heart consists of four chambers.
Many mammals (Carnivora, Ungulata) use four fingers for movement.
All insects with wings except flies and some others have four wings.
Insects of the superorder Endopterygota, also known as Holometabola, such as butterflies, ants, bees, beetles, fleas, flies, moths, and wasps, undergo holometabolism—complete metamorphism in four stages—from (1) embryo (ovum, egg), to (2) larva (such as grub, caterpillar), then (3) pupa (such as the chrysalis), and finally (4) the imago.
In the common ABO blood group system, there are four blood types (A, B, O, AB).
Humans have four canines and four wisdom teeth.
The cow's stomach is divided in four digestive compartments: reticulum, rumen, omasum and abomasum.

In chemistry
Valency of carbon (that is basis of life on the Earth) is four. Also because of its tetrahedral crystal bond structure, diamond (one of the natural allotropes of carbon) is the hardest known naturally occurring material. It is also the valence of silicon, whose compounds form the majority of the mass of the Earth's crust.
The atomic number of beryllium
There are four basic states of matter: solid, liquid, gas, and plasma.

In physics
Special relativity and general relativity treat nature as four-dimensional: 3D regular space and one-dimensional time are treated together and called spacetime. Also, any event E has a light cone composed of four zones of possible communication and cause and effect (outside the light cone is strictly incommunicado).
There are four fundamental forces (electromagnetism, gravitation, the weak nuclear force, and the strong nuclear force).
In statistical mechanics, the four functions inequality is an inequality for four functions on a finite distributive lattice.

In logic and philosophy

The symbolic meanings of the number four are linked to those of the cross and the square. "Almost from prehistoric times, the number four was employed to signify what was solid, what could be touched and felt. Its relationship to the cross (four points) made it an outstanding symbol of wholeness and universality, a symbol which drew all to itself". Where lines of latitude and longitude intersect, they divide the earth into four proportions. Throughout the world kings and chieftains have been called "lord of the four suns" or "lord of the four quarters of the earth", which is understood to refer to the extent of their powers both territorially and in terms of total control of their subjects' doings. 
The Square of Opposition, in both its Aristotelian version and its Boolean version, consists of four forms: A ("All S is R"), I ("Some S is R"), E ("No S is R"), and O ("Some S is not R").
In regard to whether two given propositions can have the same truth value, there are four separate logical possibilities: the propositions are subalterns (possibly both are true, and possibly both are false); subcontraries (both may be true, but not that both are false); contraries (both may be false, but not that both are true); or contradictories (it is not possible that both are true, and it is not possible that both are false).
Aristotle held that there are basically four causes in nature: the material, the formal, the efficient, and the final.
The Stoics held with four basic categories, all viewed as bodies (substantial and insubstantial): (1) substance in the sense of substrate, primary formless matter; (2) quality, matter's organization to differentiate and individualize something, and coming down to a physical ingredient such as pneuma, breath; (3) somehow holding (or disposed), as in a posture, state, shape, size, action, and (4) somehow holding (or disposed) toward something, as in relative location, familial relation, and so forth.
Immanuel Kant expounded a table of judgments involving four three-way alternatives, in regard to (1) Quantity, (2) Quality, (3) Relation, (4) Modality, and, based thereupon, a table of four categories, named by the terms just listed, and each with three subcategories.
Arthur Schopenhauer's doctoral thesis was On the Fourfold Root of the Principle of Sufficient Reason.
Franz Brentano held that any major philosophical period has four phases: (1) Creative and rapidly progressing with scientific interest and results; then declining through the remaining phases, (2) practical, (3) increasingly skeptical, and (4) literary, mystical, and scientifically worthless—until philosophy is renewed through a new period's first phase. (See Brentano's essay "The Four Phases of Philosophy and Its Current State" 1895, tr. by Mezei and Smith 1998.)
C. S. Peirce, usually a trichotomist, discussed four methods for overcoming troublesome uncertainties and achieving secure beliefs: (1) the method of tenacity (policy of sticking to initial belief), (2) the method of authority, (3) the method of congruity (following a fashionable paradigm), and (4) the fallibilistic, self-correcting method of science (see "The Fixation of Belief", 1877); and four barriers to inquiry, barriers refused by the fallibilist: (1) assertion of absolute certainty; (2) maintaining that something is unknowable; (3) maintaining that something is inexplicable because absolutely basic or ultimate; (4) holding that perfect exactitude is possible, especially such as to quite preclude unusual and anomalous phenomena (see "F.R.L." [First Rule of Logic], 1899).
Paul Weiss built a system involving four modes of being: Actualities (substances in the sense of substantial, spatiotemporally finite beings), Ideality or Possibility (pure normative form), Existence (the dynamic field), and God (unity). (See Weiss's Modes of Being, 1958).
Karl Popper outlined a tetradic schema to describe the growth of theories and, via generalization, also the emergence of new behaviors and living organisms: (1) problem, (2) tentative theory, (3) (attempted) error-elimination (especially by way of critical discussion), and (4) new problem(s). (See Popper's Objective Knowledge, 1972, revised 1979.)
John Boyd (military strategist) made his key concept the decision cycle or OODA loop, consisting of four stages: (1) observation (data intake through the senses), (2) orientation (analysis and synthesis of data), (3) decision, and (4) action. Boyd held that his decision cycle has philosophical generality, though for strategists the point remains that, through swift decisions, one can disrupt an opponent's decision cycle.
Richard McKeon outlined four classes (each with four subclasses) of modes of philosophical inquiry: (1) Modes of Being (Being); (2) Modes of Thought (That which is); (3) Modes of Fact (Existence); (4) Modes of Simplicity (Experience)—and, corresponding to them, four classes (each with four subclasses) of philosophical semantics: Principles, Methods, Interpretations, and Selections. (See McKeon's "Philosophic Semantics and Philosophic Inquiry" in Freedom and History and Other Essays, 1989.)
Jonathan Lowe (E.J. Lowe) argues in The Four-Category Ontology, 2006, for four categories: kinds (substantial universals), attributes (relational universals and property-universals), objects (substantial particulars), and modes (relational particulars and property-particulars, also known as "tropes"). (See Lowe's "Recent Advances in Metaphysics," 2001, Eprint)
Four opposed camps of the morality and nature of evil: moral absolutism, amoralism, moral relativism, and moral universalism.

In technology

The resin identification code used in recycling to identify low-density polyethylene.
Most furniture has four legs – tables, chairs, etc.
The four color process (CMYK) is used for printing.
Wide use of rectangles (with four angles and four sides) because they have effective form and capability for close adjacency to each other (houses, rooms, tables, bricks, sheets of paper, screens, film frames).
In the Rich Text Format specification, language code 4 is for the Chinese language.
Credit card machines have four-twelve function keys.
On most phones, the 4 key is associated with the letters G, H, and I, but on the BlackBerry Pearl, it is the key for D and F.
On many computer keyboards, the "4" key may also be used to type the dollar sign ($) if the shift key is held down.
It is the number of bits in a nibble, equivalent to half a byte
In internet slang, "4" can replace the word "for" (as "four" and "for" are pronounced similarly). For example, typing "4u" instead of "for you".
In Leetspeak, "4" may be used to replace the letter "A".
The TCP/IP stack consists of four layers.

In transport

Many internal combustion engines are called four-stroke engines because they complete one thermodynamic cycle in four distinct steps: Intake, compression, power, and exhaust.
Most vehicles, including motor vehicles, and particularly cars/automobiles and light commercial vehicles have four road wheels.
"Quattro", meaning four in the Italian language, is used by Audi as a trademark to indicate that all-wheel drive (AWD) technologies are used on Audi-branded cars. The word "Quattro" was initially used by Audi in 1980 in its original 4WD coupé, the Audi Quattro. Audi also has a privately held subsidiary company called quattro GmbH.
List of highways numbered 4

In sports
 In the Australian Football League, the top level of Australian rules football, each team is allowed 4 "interchanges" (substitute players), who can be freely substituted at any time, subject to a limit on the total number of substitutions.
In baseball:
There are four bases in the game: first base, second base, third base, and home plate; to score a run, an offensive player must complete, in the sequence shown, a circuit of those four bases.
 When a batter receives four pitches that the umpire declares to be "balls" in a single at-bat, a base on balls, informally known as a "walk", is awarded, with the batter sent to first base. 
For scoring, number 4 is assigned to the second baseman.
Four is the most runs that can be scored on any single at bat, whereby all three baserunners and the batter score (the most common being via a grand slam).
The fourth batter in the batting lineup is called the cleanup hitter.
In basketball, the number four is used to designate the power forward position, often referred to as "the four spot" or "the four".
In cricket, a four is a specific type of scoring event, whereby the ball crosses the boundary after touching the ground at least one time, scoring four runs. Taking four wickets in four consecutive balls is typically referred to as a double hat trick (two consecutive, overlapping hat tricks).
In American Football teams get four downs to reach the line of gain. 
In rowing, a four refers to a boat for four rowers, with or without coxswain. In rowing nomenclature, 4− represents a coxless four and 4+ represents a coxed four.
In rugby league:
 A try is worth 4 points.
 One of the two starting centres wears the jersey number 4. (An exception to this rule is the Super League, which uses static squad numbering.)
In rugby union:
 One of the two starting locks wears the jersey number 4.
 In the standard bonus points system, a point is awarded in the league standings to a team that scores at least 4 tries in a match, regardless of the match result.

In other fields

 The phrase "four-letter word" is used to describe many swear words in the English language.
Four is the only number whose name in English has the same number of letters as its value.
Four (formal writing: , pinyin sì) is considered an unlucky number in Chinese, Korean, Vietnamese and Japanese cultures mostly in Eastern Asia because it sounds like the word "death" (pinyin sǐ). To avoid complaints from people with tetraphobia, many numbered product lines skip the "four": e.g. Nokia cell phones (there was no series beginning with a 4 until the Nokia 4.2), Palm PDAs, etc. Some buildings skip floor 4 or replace the number with the letter "F", particularly in heavily Asian areas. See tetraphobia and Numbers in Chinese culture.
In Pythagorean numerology (a pseudocience) the number 4 represents security and stability.
The number of characters in a canonical four-character idiom.
In the NATO phonetic alphabet, the digit 4 is called "fower".
In astrology, Cancer is the 4th astrological sign of the Zodiac.

In Tarot, The Emperor is the fourth trump or Major Arcana card.
In Tetris, a game named for the Greek word for 4, every shape in the game is formed of 4 blocks each.
4 represents the number of Justices on the Supreme Court of the United States necessary to grant a writ of certiorari (i.e., agree to hear a case; it is one less than the number necessary to render a majority decision) at the court's current size.
Number Four is a character in the book series Lorien Legacies.
In the performing arts, the fourth wall is an imaginary barrier which separates the audience from the performers, and is "broken" when performers communicate directly to the audience.

In music
In written music, common time is constructed of four beats per measure and a quarter note receives one beat.
In popular or modern music, the most common time signature is also founded on four beats, i.e., 4/4 having four quarter note beats.
The common major scale is built on two sets of four notes (e.g., CDEF, GABC), where the first and last notes create an octave interval (a pair-of-four relationship).
The interval of a perfect fourth is a foundational element of many genres of music, represented in music theory as the tonic and subdominant relationship. Four is also embodied within the circle of fifths (also known as circle of fourths), which reveals the interval of four in more active harmonic contexts.
The typical number of movements in a symphony.
The number of completed, numbered symphonies by Johannes Brahms.
The number of strings on a violin, a viola, a cello, double bass, a cuatro, a typical bass guitar, and a ukulele, and the number of string pairs on a mandolin.
"Four calling birds" is the gift on the fourth day of Christmas in the carol "The Twelve Days of Christmas".

Groups of four
 Big Four (disambiguation)
Four basic operations of arithmetic: addition, subtraction, multiplication, division.
Greek classical elements (fire, air, water, earth).
Four seasons: spring, summer, autumn, winter.
The Four Seasons (disambiguation)
A leap year generally occurs every four years.
Approximately four weeks (4 times 7 days) to a lunar month (synodic month = 29.53 days). Thus the number four is universally an integral part of primitive sacred calendars.
Four weeks of Advent (and four Advent candles on the Advent wreath).
Four cardinal directions: north, south, east, west.
Four Temperaments: sanguine, choleric, melancholic, phlegmatic.
Four Humors: blood, yellow bile, black bile, phlegm.
Four Great Ancient Capitals of China.
Four-corner method.
Four Asian Tigers, referring to the economies of Hong Kong, Taiwan, South Korea, and Singapore
Cardinal principles.
Four cardinal virtues: justice, prudence, temperance, fortitude.
Four suits of playing cards: hearts, diamonds, clubs, spades.
Four nations of the United Kingdom: England, Wales, Scotland, Northern Ireland.
Four provinces of Ireland: Munster, Ulster, Leinster, Connacht.
Four estates: politics, administration, judiciary, journalism. Especially in the expression "Fourth Estate", which means journalism.
Four Corners is the only location in the United States where four states come together at a single point: Colorado, Utah, New Mexico, and Arizona.
 Four Evangelists – Matthew, Mark, Luke, and John
 Four Doctors of Western Church – Saint Gregory the Great, Saint Ambrose, Saint Augustine, and Saint Jerome
 Four Doctors of Eastern Church – Saint John Chrysostom, Saint Basil the Great, and Gregory of Nazianzus and Saint Athanasius
 Four Galilean moons of Jupiter – Io, Europa, Ganymede, and Callisto
 The Gang of Four was a Chinese communist political faction.
 The Fantastic Four: Mr. Fantastic, The Invisible Woman, The Human Torch, The Thing.
 The Teenage Mutant Ninja Turtles: Leonardo, Michelangelo, Donatello, Raphael
 The Beatles were also known as the "Fab Four": John Lennon, Paul McCartney, George Harrison, Ringo Starr.
 Gang of Four is a British post-punk rock band formed in the late 1970s.
 Four rivers in the Garden of Eden (Genesis 2:10–14): Pishon (perhaps the Jaxartes or Syr Darya), Gihon (perhaps the Oxus or Amu Darya), Hiddekel (Tigris), and P'rat (Euphrates).
 There are also four years in a single Olympiad (duration between the Olympic Games). Many major international sports competitions follow this cycle, among them the FIFA World Cup and its women's version, the FIBA World Championships for men and women, and the Rugby World Cup.
 There are four limbs on the human body.
 Four Houses of Hogwarts in the Harry Potter series: Gryffindor, Hufflepuff, Ravenclaw, Slytherin.
 Four known continents of the world in the A Song of Ice and Fire series: Westeros, Essos, Sothoryos, Ulthos.
 Each Grand Prix in Nintendo's Mario Kart series is divided into four cups and each cup is divided into four courses. The Mushroom Cup, Flower Cup, Star Cup, and Special Cup make up the Nitro Grand Prix, while the Shell Cup, Banana Cup, Leaf Cup, and the Lightning Cup make up the Retro Grand Prix.

See also 
List of highways numbered 4

References

Wells, D. The Penguin Dictionary of Curious and Interesting Numbers London: Penguin Group. (1987): 55–58

External links

Marijn.Org on Why is everything four?
A few thoughts on the number four, by Penelope Merritt at samuel-beckett.net
The Number 4
The Positive Integer 4
Prime curiosities: 4

Integers